Pamela Wright (born 26 June 1964) is a professional golfer who played on the Ladies European Tour and LPGA Tour. She played in the European Solheim Cup team in 1990, 1992 and 1994.

Golf career
Wright lost to Maureen Madill in a playoff for the 1980 Ladies' British Open Amateur Stroke Play Championship, after taking a bogey 5 at the first extra hole. She played for the Great Britain & Ireland team in the 1981 Vagliano Trophy. In 1982 she met Jane Connachan in the final of the Scottish Women's Amateur Championship, losing at the 19th hole. In 1985 she won the Helen Holm Scottish Women's Open Championship by two strokes from Belle Robertson. Wright played collegiate golf at Arizona State University and was All-American Second team in 1987 and All-American and All-Conference First team in 1988.

She was a member of the European Solheim Cup team in 1990, 1992 and 1994.

Personal life
Wright is the daughter of Innes, who was a golf professional in Aboyne, Scotland and Janette, a leading Scottish amateur golfer.

Team appearances
Amateur
Vagliano Trophy (representing Great Britain & Ireland): 1981
European Ladies' Team Championship (representing Scotland) 1981, 1983, 1985, 1987
Women's Home Internationals (representing Scotland): 1981, 1982, 1983, 1984
Girls Home Internationals (representing Scotland): 1979, 1980

Professional
Solheim Cup (representing Europe): 1990, 1992 (winners), 1994

References

External links

Scottish female golfers
Arizona State Sun Devils women's golfers
Ladies European Tour golfers
LPGA Tour golfers
Solheim Cup competitors for Europe
1964 births
Living people